Nadeem Razaq (died 2016) was a Hong Kong resident of Pakistani origin who was convicted of the March 2008 murders of three prostitutes in Hong Kong.

In 2016, Razaq committed suicide by hanging.

Early life
Razaq was born in Pakistan, and came to Hong Kong at a young age.

Murders and trial
Razaq was arrested in Macau on 18 March 2008, just days after the murders. He stated that he was beaten by Macau police while in their custody. Razaq initially confessed to the murders, claiming he had committed them on the instruction of Macau loan sharks to whom he owed money; however, he later withdrew this confession. He came before Judge Clare-Marie Beeson of the High Court of Hong Kong, and pleaded not guilty to the murders; a seven-member jury found him guilty in July 2009, and Beeson sentenced him to life imprisonment.

Victims
Sze Ming-lan "CoCo", 35, found in Tung Lok Street, Yuen Long on 15 March 2008
Sun Xiu-min "Salsa", 30, found in Tai Po at 10:15 PM on 16 March 2008
Tse Hau-yuen "Qi-qi", 35, found at number 80 Kwong Fuk Road, Tai Po at 12:45 AM on 17 March 2008

References

Hong Kong murderers
2016 deaths
Pakistani emigrants to Hong Kong
Year of birth missing
Spree killers
Murderers who committed suicide in prison custody
Suicides by hanging
Suicides in Hong Kong